Baba Deep Singh (26 January 1682 – 13 November 1757) is revered among Sikhs as one of the most hallowed martyrs in Sikhism. He is remembered for his sacrifice and devotion to the teachings of the Sikh Gurus. Baba Deep Singh was the first head of Misl Shaheedan Tarna Dal   –  an order of the Khalsa military established by Nawab Kapur Singh, the then head of Sharomani Panth Akali Buddha Dal. The Damdami Taksal also state that he was the first head of their order.

Early life 
Baba Deep Singh was born on 26 January 1682 to his father Bhagta, and his mother Jioni. He lived in the village of Pahuwind in Amritsar district. He was born into a Sandhu Jat Sikh family.

He went to Anandpur Sahib on the day of Vaisakhi in 1700, where he was baptised into Khalsa by Guru Gobind Singh, through the Khande di Pahul or Amrit Sanchar (ceremonial initiation into Khalsa). As a youth, he spent considerable time in close companionship of Guru Gobind Singh Ji, learning weaponry, riding and other martial skills. From Bhai Mani Singh, he learnt reading and writing Gurmukhi and the interpretation of the Gurus' words. After spending two years at Anandpur, he returned to his village in 1702, before he was summoned by Guru Gobind Singh Ji at Talwandi Sabo in 1705, where he helped Bhai Mani Singh in making copies of the scripture Guru Granth Sahib.

Warrior

Misldar 

In 1709, Baba Deep Singh joined Banda Singh Bahadur during the Battle of Sadhaura and the Battle of Chappar Chiri. In 1733, Nawab Kapur Singh appointed him a leader of an armed squad (jatha). On the Vaisakhi of 1748, at the meeting of the Sarbat Khalsa in Amritsar, the 65 jathas of the Dal Khalsa were reorganized into twelve Misls. Baba Deep Singh was entrusted with the leadership of the Shaheed Misl.

The Demolition of the Harmandir Sahib 

In April 1757, Ahmad Shah Durrani raided Northern India for the fourth time. While he was on his way back to Kabul from Delhi with young men and women as captives, the Sikhs made a plan to relieve him of the valuables and free the captives. The squad of Baba Deep Singh was deployed near Kurukshetra. His squad freed a large number of prisoners and raided Durrani's considerable treasury. On his arrival in Lahore, Durrani, embittered by his loss, ordered the demolition of the Harmandir Sahib (the "Golden Gurudwara"). The shrine was blown up and the sacred pool filled with the entrails of slaughtered animals. Durrani assigned the Punjab region to his son, Prince Timur Shah, and left him a force of ten thousand men under General Jahan Khan.

Baba Deep Singh, 75 years old, felt that it was up to him to atone for the sin of having let the Afghans desecrate the shrine. He emerged from scholastic retirement and declared to a congregation at Damdama Sahib that he intended to rebuild the temple. Five hundred men came forward to go with him. Baba Deep Singh offered prayers before starting for Amritsar: "May my head fall at the Darbar Sahib." As he went from hamlet to hamlet, many villagers joined him. By the time baba Deep Singh reached Tarn Taran Sahib, ten miles from Amritsar, over five thousand Sikhs armed with hatchets, swords, and spears accompanied him.

Death 
Baba Deep Singh had vowed to avenge the desecration of the Golden Temple by the Afghan army. In 1757, he led an army to defend the Golden Temple. The Sikhs and the Afghans clashed in the Battle of Amritsar on 13 November 1757, and in the ensuing conflict Baba Deep Singh was decapitated.

There are two accounts of Baba Deep Singh's death. According to one popular version, Baba Deep Singh continued to fight after having been completely decapitated, slaying his enemies with his head in one hand and his sword in the other. In this version, only upon reaching the sacred city of Amritsar did he stop and finally die. According to the second version, he was mortally wounded with a blow to the neck, but not completely decapitated. After receiving this blow, a Sikh reminded Baba Deep Singh, "You had resolved to reach the periphery of the pool." On hearing the talk of the Sikh, he held his head with his left hand and removing the enemies from his way with the strokes of his  Khanda "with his right hand, reached the periphery of Harmandir Sahib where he breathed his last. The Singhs celebrated the Bandhi-Sor Divas of 1757 A.D. in Harmandir Sahib".

The Sikhs recovered their prestige by defeating the Afghan army and the latter were forced to flee.

The spot where Baba Deep Singh's head fell is marked in the Golden Temple complex, and Sikhs from around the world pay their respects there.  Baba Deep Singh's Khanda (double-edged sword), which he used in his final battle, is still preserved at Akal Takht, first of the five centers of temporal Sikh authority.

In popular culture 
Anokhe Amar Shaheed Baba Deep Singh Ji, an Indian historical biographical film by Jaswinder Chahal was released in 2006.

Gallery

See also 

 Martyrdom in Sikhism

References

Further reading

External links

History of Punjab
Sikh Empire
Indian Sikhs
Sikh martyrs
Sikh warriors
Military personnel from Amritsar
1757 deaths
1682 births